Samolus junceus in the family Primulaceae is a species of water pimpernel native to Western Australia.

Description
Samolus junceus is an erect or straggling, perennial  herb, which grows from 15 cm to 120 cm high, and is almost leafless. Its flowers are white/pink, and may be seen from September to December or January to April. It grows in wet places on sandy, peaty and clayey soils.

Taxonomy 
The species was first described by Robert Brown in 1810.  There are no synonyms.

References

External links
samolus junceus occurrence data from GBIF 

junceus
Plants described in 1810
Flora of Western Australia
Taxa named by Robert Brown (botanist, born 1773)